Nervous System Failure is the third full-length album by the Italian band Infernal Poetry (fifth studio-album), released on 25 June 2009 through Casket Records, sub-label of Copro.

Truemetal said it is "simply the best extreme record released in Italy after Sadist early years."

Track list 
 "User Advisory"
 "Post-split Anathemas"
 "Forbidden Apples"
 "Brain Pop-Ups"
 "They Dance in Circles"
 "The Heater, The Wall, The Hitter"
 "The Next Is Mine" (feat. Trevor, from Italian cult band Sadist, as guest vocalist)
 "Back To Monkey"
 "La Macchina Del Trapasso"
 "Pathological Acts at 37 Degrees"
 "Drive-Gig Drive-Gig"
 "Wizard Touch pt. 3"
 "Nervous System Failure"

Line up 
 Daniele Galassi – rhythm guitars, lead guitar
 Christian Morbidoni – rhythm guitars
 Alessandro Infusini – bass
 Paolo Ojetti – lead vocals
 Alessandro Vagnoni – drums, loops

Notes 

2009 albums
Infernal Poetry albums